USS Rigel is a name used more than once by the United States Navy:

 , built in 1918 as Edgecombe by the Skinner and Eddy Corp., Seattle, Washington.
 , laid down under Maritime Administration contract 15 March 1954 by the Ingalls Shipbuilding Corp., Pascagoula, Mississippi.

United States Navy ship names